The Festival de Brasília (Brasilia Film Festival), officially Festival de Brasília do Cinema Brasileiro, is a film festival held in Brasília, Brazil. Known as Semana do Cinema Brasileiro (Brazilian Film Week) during the first two editions, it was founded by University of Brasília's diplomat Paulo Emílio Sales Gomes in 1965 and is the oldest film festival in Brazil.

The winners receive Troféu Candango (Candango Trophy), in honor of brasilienses, as well as cash prizes.

Category

Feature film 
Best Feature Film
Best Director 
Best Actor 
Best Actress
Best Supporting Actor 
Best Supporting Actress 
Best Screenplay 
Best Photograph 
Best Art Direction 
Best Soundtrack 
Best Sound 
Best Editing

Short film 
Best Short film
Best Director  
Best Actor 
Best Actress  
Best Screenplay  
Best Photograph 
Best Art Direction 
Best Soundtrack 
Best Sound 
Best Editing

References

External links
 

1965 establishments in Brazil
Film festivals in Brazil
Recurring events established in 1965
Arts in Brasília
Festivals in Brasília